The 2013 Western Carolina Catamounts team represented Western Carolina University as a member of the Southern Conference (SoCon) during the 2013 NCAA Division I FCS football season. Led by second-year head coach Mark Speir, the Catamounts compiled an overall record of 2–10 with a mark of 1–7 in conference play, tying for eighth place in the SoCon. Western Carolina played their home games at Bob Waters Field at E. J. Whitmire Stadium in Cullowhee, North Carolina.

The Catamounts entered this season with a new defensive coordinator, Shawn Quinn, who joined the team after serving two seasons in the same position at Charleston Southern University.

Schedule

References

Western Carolina
Western Carolina Catamounts football seasons
Western Carolina Catamounts football